Elkwood Township was formerly a township in Roseau County, Minnesota.

History
The township was dissolved in 1937 and is now part of the large unorganized territory of Roseau County.  Elkwood Township once had elk roaming in its prairies, but is mostly forested.

Notes

Defunct townships in Minnesota
Geography of Roseau County, Minnesota